KCC Corporation (renamed from Kumkang Korea Chemicals Co., Ltd. on February 25, 2005) is a Korean chemical and auto parts manufacturer, headquartered in Seoul, South Korea.

Operations
KCC's products include various kinds of paints, float glass, soft sponges, silicon, chassis, and car parts. This company is the biggest provider of construction materials and paints in South Korea. Various types of industrial materials such as epoxy moulding compound, alumina metallizing, silicone etc. are produced in 13 domestic locations.
KCC Corporation has 9 overseas liaison offices and 7 overseas factories over the world:
 KCC Houston (Texas, U.S. - Liaison Office)
 KCC Tokyo (Tokyo, Japan - Liaison Office)
 KCC Hong Kong (Hong Kong, China - Liaison Office)
 KCC Dubai (Dubai, U.A.E. - Liaison Office)
 KCC Greece (Piraeus, Greece - Liaison Office)
 KCC Hamburg (Hamburg, Germany - Liaison Office)
 KCC Iran (Teheran, Iran - Liaison Office)
 KCC Moscow (Moscow, Russia - Liaison Office)
 KCC Shanghai (Shanghai, China - Liaison Office)
 KCC Kunshan (Shanghai, China - Paint Factory)
 KCC Beijing (Beijing, China - Paint Factory)
 KCC Guangzhou (Guangzhou, China - Paint Factory)
 KCC Singapore (Singapore - Paint Factory)
 KCC Malaysia (Kuala Lumpur, Malaysia - Paint Factory)
 KCC India (Chennai, India - Paint Factory)
 KCC Turkey (Istanbul, Turkey - Paint Factory)
 KCC Poland (Lublin, Poland - Liaison Office)
 KCC Vietnam (Ho Chi Minh, VietNam - Liaison Office)

Main Rivals in Silicone Markets
KCC's silicone is one of major market which is developing. There are some main rivals for this Korean company to develop market as the list below:
 Dow Corning (USA)
 Momentive (USA)
 Shin-Etsu (Japan)
 Wacker (Germany)
 Bluestar silicone (China)

Purchasing Basildon Chemical
April 2011, Basildon Chemicals was purchased by the KCC Corporation of Korea. In this partnership, KCC gains a company with a history in silicone emulsification.

See also 
Economy of South Korea
Jeonju KCC Egis

References

Chemical companies of South Korea
Manufacturing companies based in Seoul
Chemical companies established in 1958
Auto parts suppliers of South Korea
Paint manufacturers
Companies listed on the Korea Exchange
South Korean brands
Chaebol
Hyundai
South Korean companies established in 1958